Nazih Halim Elasmar  (Arabic: نزيه حليم الأسمر) (born 16 April 1953), is a former Lebanese-Australian politician and was a member of the Victorian Legislative Council for the Labor Party between 2006 and 2022.

In 2006 Victorian state elections, Elasmar was elected to the Northern Metropolitan Region. He was previously the mayor of the City of Darebin in 1997.

In June 2020, Elasmar was elected as the President of the Victorian Legislative Council, succeeding Shaun Leane who was appointed to cabinet. In October 2021, Elasmar was accused in the Independent Broad-based Anti-corruption Commission (IBAC) hearings for branch stacking and paying for people's memberships, which is not allowed in the Labor Party. In December, during preselection, Elasmar was moved down into unwinnable positions on the Legislative Council ballot for the November 2022 election. He subsequently chose not to contest the election and gave his valedictory statement on 21 September 2022.

Elasmar was born in Lebanon and came to Australia at the age of 20. He is married with three children.

References

General citations

External links
 Parliamentary voting record of Nazih Elasmar at Victorian Parliament Tracker

1953 births
Living people
Members of the Victorian Legislative Council
Presidents of the Victorian Legislative Council
Australian Labor Party members of the Parliament of Victoria
Mayors of places in Victoria (Australia)
Victoria (Australia) local councillors
Recipients of the Medal of the Order of Australia
Recipients of the Centenary Medal
Lebanese emigrants to Australia
21st-century Australian politicians